Cheeky may refer to:

 Cheeky (film) or Trasgredire, a 2000 sex comedy directed by Tinto Brass
 Cheeky Watson (born 1954), South African rugby union player
 Cheeky Weekly, a defunct British comics magazine
 Cheeky, Australian hip hop artist in the group Downsyde
 "Cheeky", a 2002 song by Bruce Boniface
 Cheeky, a style of bikini underwear or swimsuit
 Cheeky Records, a British record label founded by Rollo Armstrong

See also
 Cheekye, British Columbia, Canada, an unincorporated locality
 Cheek (disambiguation)